Nestlé Wagner GmbH is a brand of frozen pizzas, sold in Europe, founded by Ernst Wagner in 1952 in Nonnweiler, Germany, and since 2010 owned by Nestlé.

Product series 
 Sensazione
 Original Piccolinis
 Big Pizza
 Steinofen

References

External links
 

Nestlé brands